Francisco José de Goya y Lucientes  was a Spanish romantic painter and printmaker, and the most important Spanish artist of the late 18th and early 19th centuries. Immensely successful in his lifetime, he is often referred to as both the last of the Old Masters and the first of the moderns.  He was also one of the great portraitists of his time. 

Goya's work begins approximately in 1762 when he painted a reliquary for the church of Fuendetodos and continued till his death in 1828. During these years, the painter produced around 700 paintings, 280 prints and several thousand drawings. The work evolved from the Rococo stylee, typical of its tapestry cartoons, to the very personal Black Paintings, passing through the official paintings for the court of Charles IV of Spain and Ferdinand VII of Spain.

Goya's themes were wide: portraits, genre scenes (hunting, gallant and popular scenes, vices of society, violence, witchcraft), historical, religious frescoes, as well as still lifes. His work now in the Prado Museum is particularly important both in terms of its quality and quantity. However, his work is present in most major museums around the world.

The following is an incomplete list of works by the Spanish painter and printmaker Francisco Goya.

Paintings (1763–1774)

Paintings (1775–1792)
see also: List of Francisco Goya's tapestry cartoons

Paintings (1793–1807)

Paintings (1808–1818)

Paintings (1819–1828)

Prints (Los Caprichos)

As well as paintings Goya was also one of the greatest ever printmakers. He produced several sets of prints using the relatively new technique of aquatint. Towards the end of his life Goya also began to experiment with lithography. The dimensions given refer to the size of the printed image rather than the paper that the image is printed on.

Prints (Disasters of War)

Prints (La Tauromaquia)

Prints (Los disparates)

Prints (Bulls of Bordeaux)

Prints (Other prints)

See also 

 List of Francisco Goya's tapestry cartoons
 Black paintings

Notes

References

External links
 Catalogue at University of Zaragossa
 Goya at the Prado

 List of works
Goya